ʿAbd al-Ḥāmid al-Qādirī al-Badāyūnī (November 11, 1898 – July 20, 1970) was a traditional Islamic scholar, Sufi master, poet, and leader from Pakistan. He was the founder of the Islamic college Jamia-Talimat-e-Islamiya located in Karachi.

Family background
Badayuni was born in Delhi, India on November 11, 1898. His father, Hakim Abdul Qayyum, died 20 days after he was born. His grandfather, Abdul Majid Qadri, was a Shaikh of Qadri Sufi Order. He received his religious education from his uncle Abdul Qadir, and studied Islamic Medicine in Delhi with Hakim Ajmal Khan. The scholars of Badayun were active in dissemination of their Aqidah in refutation of sects which they considered heretical.

Education
Badayuni studied Islamic Sciences at Madrasa Qadiriya and Madrasa Ilahiya, Kanpur.
He received ijazat in Silsila e Chishtiya (Sabria)and Qadria from his Sheikh Maulana Muhammad Shafi Khawaja Nasir ud Deen Rampuri.

Leader of community
In the Khilafat Movement, he was a member of the Central Khilafat Committee of Bombay. He took a stand against the Shuddhi movement, which was initiated by Hindu Arya Samajis to reconvert Indian Muslims to Hinduism. Abdul Hamid left the Indian National Congress and joined Markazi Tableeg al-Islam to oppose the Shuddhi Movement and actively worked to prevent the reversion of Muslims to Hinduism with Naeem-ud-Deen Muradabadi, Abdul Hafiz Qadri, Syed Peer Jamaat Ali Shah and Syed Abu al-Hasanat Qadri.

Association with Muslim League 
He was a member of the All India Muslim League Council beginning in 1937. He neutralized the influence of Pro-Congress Deobandi Scholar Hussain Ahmad Madni in Sylhet and Bengal in favor of the Muslim League. The resolution for the creation of Pakistan was adopted on March 23, 1940. He spoke in favor of the resolution at Minto Park, Lahore. At the All India Sunni Conference held at Banaras in 1946, Peer Jamaat Ali Shah declared Muhammad Ali Jinnah a Muslim and Maulana Abdul Hamid supported Syed Jamaat Ali Shah and spoke for more than 3 hours in support of Quid-e-Azam & the Muslim League.

Badayuni went to Hijaz in 1946 under the leadership of Muhammad Abdul Aleem Siddiqi to request that the Saudi Government end the Hajj Tax and also to explain the mission of the Muslim League to create an independent Pakistan. He visited Haramain Sharifain 22 times and met many Muslim Leaders. He was a founding member of the Council of Islamic Ideology and also held the post of President of Jamiat Ulema-e-Pakistan which was a prominent body of the Sunni Barelvi movement in Pakistan. He was at the forefront of Majlis-e-Tahaffuz-e-Khatme Nabuwwat and was jailed for three months in Karachi. He believed that non-Muslims should not be made ministers in an Islamic nation. He raised the demand of making Pakistan an Islamic nation and view of Ulama should be given preference over secular law. He was on the forefront of persecuting the Ahmadiyyah  and demanded that the Ahmadi should be declared non Muslim, and through All India Muslim league he demanded that Ahmadi should not be made members of the Muslim League.

Works
He authored many books in Urdu, Arabic & English and wrote devotional poetry.

Death
Badayuni died in Karachi on 20 July  1970 (15 Jamadi-al-Aula 1390 Hijri) and was buried on the grounds of the Islamic College located on Manghopir Road.

See also
Syed Faiz-ul Hassan Shah
Peer Jamaat Ali Shah
Ahle Sunnat Barelvi
Sufism

References

Further reading
Tadhkira Akabir Ahle Sunnat, Muhammad Abdul Hakim Sharaf Qadri
Maulana Abdul Hamid Badayuni: Hyat aur Qaumi wa Milli Khidmat, Maulana Syed Muhammad Faruq Ahmad Qadri
Hyat Mujahid e Millat, Dr. Nasiruddin Siddiqui
Mujahid e Millat Maulana Abdul Hamid Badayuni RA ke Milli wa Siasi Khidmat, Zahooruddin Khan Amratsri

Sufism
Islam in Pakistan
Pakistani Sunni Muslim scholars of Islam
Pakistani Sufis
Pakistani people of Arab descent
Hanafis
Barelvis
Sunni imams
Indian independence movement
Pakistan Movement activists
Muhajir people
People from Budaun
Qadiri order